John D. Alderson (November 29, 1854December 5, 1910) was a  lawyer and Democratic politician from West Virginia who served as a United States representative from West Virginia.

Biography
He was born at Nicholas Court House, Virginia (now Summersville, West Virginia) on November 29, 1854. He was a member of the 51st, 52nd, and 53rd United States Congresses. He died December 5, 1910.

He served as sergeant at arms of the West Virginia Senate from 1871 to 1873, and the State Senate's doorkeeper in 1872 and 1873. After studying law, he was admitted to the bar in 1876 and entered practice at Nicholas County Court House. He was appointed prosecuting attorney for the counties of Nicholas and Webster in 1876. He  was subsequently elected prosecuting attorney for these counties and then re-elected in 1880 and 1884, serving until January 1, 1889. He also served as clerk of the State Senate from 1883 to 1887. He  was elected as a Democrat to the Fifty-first, Fifty-second, and Fifty-third Congresses (March 4, 1889 – March 3, 1895).

His candidacy for re-election in 1894 was unsuccessful. Afterward, he returned to his law the practice in Nicholas County. He served as a delegate to the Democratic National Conventions in 1900 and 1908. He died in Richwood, West Virginia, in Nicholas County on December 5, 1910, and was buried in a private burial ground at Summersville, West Virginia.

See also
United States congressional delegations from West Virginia

Sources

Online. September 11, 2007.

1854 births
1910 deaths
19th-century American lawyers
20th-century American lawyers
County prosecuting attorneys in West Virginia
People from Summersville, West Virginia
West Virginia lawyers
Democratic Party members of the United States House of Representatives from West Virginia
19th-century American politicians